The Admiralty Mountains (alternatively Admiralty Range) is a large group of high mountains and individually named ranges and ridges in northeastern Victoria Land, Antarctica. This mountain group is bounded by the Ross Sea, the Southern Ocean, and by the Dennistoun, Ebbe, and Tucker glaciers. The mountain range is situated on the Pennell Coast, a portion of Antarctica lying between Cape Williams and Cape Adare.

It was discovered in January 1841 by Captain James Ross, who named them for the Lords Commissioners of the Admiralty under whose orders he served.

The Admiralty Mountains are divided into the Dunedin Range, Homerun Range, and Lyttelton Range.

Mountains and peaks 

This range includes the following mountains and peaks:

Mount Achilles 
Mount Achilles is a prominent pyramidal mountain rising from the divide between Fitch Glacier and Man-o-War Glacier. Named by New Zealand Geological Survey Antarctic Expedition (NZGSAE), 1957–58, after the former New Zealand cruiser .

Mount Adam 
Mount Adam is situated  WNW of Mount Minto. Discovered in January 1841 by Captain Ross who named this feature for Vice Admiral Sir Charles Adam, a senior naval lord of the Admiralty.

Mount Ajax 

Mount Ajax rises 1.5 km (1 mi) WSW of Mount Royalist. Named by the New Zealand GSAE, 1957–58, after HMNZS Ajax. The mountain is one of several in this area named for New Zealand ships.

Mount Bevin 
Mount Bevin is a prominent sharply pointed mountain at the western side of the head of Murray Glacier. The mountain stands 2 miles (3.2 km) west-northwest of Mount Sabine. Named by Advisory Committee on Antarctic Names (US-ACAN) (2004) after Anthony (Tony) J. Bevin, Surveyor-General of New Zealand, and Chairman of the New Zealand Geographic Board, 1996–2004, with responsibility for New Zealand surveying and place naming in Antarctica.

Mount Black Prince 
Mount Black Prince is composed of dark colored rock, which tends to create an imposing appearance. Named by the New Zealand Geological Survey Antarctic Expedition (NZ GSAE), 1957–58, for its appearance and also for the New Zealand Cruiser HMNZS Black Prince.

Mount Gilruth 
Mount Gilruth is a mostly ice-covered mountain (3,160 m) 4.5 nautical miles (8 km) east-northeast of Mount Adam. Mapped by United States Geological Survey (USGS) from surveys and U.S. Navy air photos, 1960-63.  Named by Advisory Committee on Antarctic Names (US-ACAN) for Robert R. Gilruth of the National Aeronautics and Space Administration, a visitor at McMurdo Station, 1966-67.

Mount Minto 
Mount Minto is a lofty, mostly ice-free mountain located  E of Mount Adam in the central portion of the range. Discovered in January 1841 by Captain James Ross, who named it for the Earl of Minto, then First Lord of the Admiralty. The first ascent was made in 1988 by the Australian Bicentennial Antarctic Expedition led by Greg Mortimer and included Lincoln Hall.

Mount Parker 
Mount Parker is a bluff-type mountain along the western side of Nash Glacier. The area was mapped by the USGS from surveys and U.S. Navy air photos, 1960-63. The name Mount Parker was given to a mountain in this general vicinity by Captain James Ross, in 1840, honoring Vice Admiral Sir William Parker, a senior naval lord of the Admiralty, 1834-41. For the sake of historical continuity US-ACAN has retained the name for this mountain.

Mount Peacock 
It was discovered in January 1841 by Captain Ross who named it for the Very Reverend Dr. George Peacock, Dean of Ely.

Mount Royalist 
Named by the New Zealand GSAE, 1957–58, for its impressive appearance and also for the New Zealand cruiser HMNZS Royalist. Several adjacent peaks are named for New Zealand ships including Mount Ajax and Mount Black Prince.

Mount Sabine 
Mount Sabine is a prominent, relatively snow-free mountain rising between the heads of Murray Glacier and Burnette Glacier. Discovered on January 11, 1841, by Captain James Ross, Royal Navy, who named this feature for Lieutenant Colonel Edward Sabine of the Royal Artillery, Foreign Secretary of the Royal Society, one of the most active supporters of the expedition.

Features

 Atkinson Glacier
 Baldwin Bluff
 Brewer Peak
 Burnette Glacier
 Church Glacier
 Church Ridge
 Cracktrack Glacier
 Crandall Peak
 DeAngelo Glacier
 Deming Glacier
 Dennistoun Glacier
 DuBridge Range
 Dugdale Glacier
 Dunedin Range
 Elsner Ridge
 Fendley Glacier
 Field Névé
 Findlay Range
 Fischer Ridge
 Fitch Glacier
 Fowlie Glacier
 Freimanis Glacier
 Gadsden Peaks
 Geikie Ridge
 Grigg Peak
 Helman Glacier
 Ironside Glacier
 Jennings Peak
 Kelly Glacier
 Kirk Glacier
 Lange Peak
 Lann Glacier
 Leander Glacier
 Luther Peak
 Lyttelton Range
 Man-o-War Glacier
 Massey Glacier
 Meier Peak
 Mount Achilles
 Mount Bierle
 Mount Brazil
 Mount Chider
 Mount Emerson
 Mount Eos
 Mount Faget
 Mount Francis
 Mount Frishman
 Mount Gleaton
 Mount Granholm
 Mount Greene
 Mount Hart
 Mount Herschel
 Mount Humphrey Lloyd
 Mount Kyle
 Mount LeResche
 Mount Lozen
 Mount Midnight
 Mount Parker
 Mount Pearigen
 Mount Pew
 Mount Pittard
 Mount Ruegg
 Mount Schaefer
 Mount Shadow
 Mount Shelton
 Mount Titus
 Mount Von Braun
 Mount Whewell
 Mount Wright
 Murray Glacier
 Nash Glacier
 Novasio Ridge
 Ommanney Glacier
 Pitkevitch Glacier
 Rastorfer Glacier
 Robinson Heights
 Rowles Glacier
 Saxby Pass
 Shipley Glacier
 Simpson Glacier
 Slagle Ridge
 Slone Glacier
 Sorensen Peak
 Splettstoesser Pass
 Staircase Glacier
 Stamper Peak
 Tocci Glacier
 Tombstone Hill
 Tucker Glacier
 Wallis Glacier
 Wetmore Peak
 Whewell Glacier
 Whitehall Glacier
 Wylie Ridge

References

 
Mountain ranges of Victoria Land
Pennell Coast
Four-thousanders of Antarctica